Phillip Thuaux (born 9 July 1979 in Point Clare, New South Wales) is an Australian professional racing cyclist.

Palmarès 

 2001
 1st, Tour of the Tamar

 2002
 3rd, Overall, Canberra Tour
 1st, Stage 1
 1st, Stage 3
 2nd, Overall, Tour of South China Sea
 3rd, Stage 1
 1st, Stage 2

 2004
 1st, Drie Zustersteden
 2nd, Overall, Tour de Hongrie
 1st, Stage 2

 2005
 Oceania Games
 2nd, Road race

 2006
 2006–2007 World Cup
 3rd, Pursuit, Sydney
 Oceania Games, Melbourne
 1st, Team Pursuit (with Zachary Dempster, Hayden Josefski and Stephen Rossendell)

 2007
 National Track Championships, Sydney
 1st, Pursuit
 2nd, Team Pursuit
 Oceania Championships, Invercargill
 1st, Pursuit
 1st, Team Pursuit (with Mark Jamieson, Cameron Meyer and Travis Meyer)
 2007–2008 World Cup
 2nd, Pursuit, Sydney

External links 

Australian male cyclists
Australian track cyclists
1979 births
Living people
Cyclists from New South Wales